Susteren is a railway station in Susteren, Netherlands. The station was opened in 1862 and is located on the Maastricht–Venlo railway, also known as Staatslijn E. Train services are operated by Arriva.

Train services
The following train services call at this station:
Stoptrein: Maastricht Randwyck–Sittard–Roermond

Bus services
 70: Sittard–Nieuwstadt–Susteren–Roosteren

External links
NS website 
Dutch public transport travel planner 

Railway stations in Limburg (Netherlands)
Railway stations opened in 1862
Railway stations on the Staatslijn E
Echt-Susteren
1862 establishments in the Netherlands
Railway stations in the Netherlands opened in the 19th century